Peseux may refer to:

Peseux, Neuchâtel, a commune in the Swiss canton of Neuchâtel
Péseux, a commune in the French department of Doubs
Peseux, Jura, a commune in the French department of Jura